Frezarpur is a census town in Bastar district  in the state of Chhattisgarh, India.

Demographics
 India census, Frezarpur had a population of 9630. Males constitute 51% of the population and females 49%. Frezarpur has an average literacy rate of 76%, higher than the national average of 59.5%: male literacy is 83%, and female literacy is 69%. In Frezarpur, 11% of the population is under 6 years of age.

Distance from raipur & population

References

Cities and towns in Bastar district